Pedro Zenon Navarrete Montaño (born 30 July 1981) is a Mexican professional boxer. Pedro is the former WBC CABOFE Featherweight and WBC FECOMBOX Super Featherweight Champion.

Professional career

On 3 May 2007 Navarrete beat Gerardo Mijares to win the inaugural WBC FECOMBOX Super Featherweight title.

In May 2010, Pedro lost to undefeated Mikey Garcia on the undercard of Garcia–Margarito.

References

External links

1981 births
Living people
Mexican male boxers
Lightweight boxers
Boxers from the State of Mexico